German submarine U-408 was a Type VIIC U-boat of Nazi Germany's Kriegsmarine during World War II.

She carried out three patrols. She sank three ships.

She was a member of two wolfpacks.

She was sunk by a US aircraft north of Iceland on 5 November 1942.

Design
German Type VIIC submarines were preceded by the shorter Type VIIB submarines. U-408 had a displacement of  when at the surface and  while submerged. She had two shafts and two  propellers.

U-408 was fitted with five  torpedo tubes (four fitted at the bow and one at the stern), fourteen torpedoes, one  SK C/35 naval gun, 220 rounds, and a  C/30 anti-aircraft gun. The boat had a complement of between forty-four and sixty.

Service history
The submarine was laid down on 30 September 1940 at the Danziger Werft at Danzig (now Gdansk) as yard number 109, launched on 16 July 1941 and commissioned on 19 November under the command of Korvettenkapitän Reinhard von Hymmen.

She served with the 5th U-boat Flotilla from 19 November 1941 for training and the 9th flotilla from 1 May 1942 for operations. She was reassigned to the 11th flotilla on 1 July 1942 and served with that organization until her loss.

First patrol
U-408s first patrol was preceded by a move from Kiel in Germany to Skjomenfjord in Norway. She left there for her first patrol on 7 June, sailing through the north Norwegian Sea into the Barents Sea. She returned to Skjomenfjord on 16 July 1942.

Second patrol
The boat set-out on her second foray on 10 September 1942. She also sank Oliver Ellsworth with the same spread of torpedoes. The master of the Soviet ship, A. Sakharov, was awarded the George Cross after acting as pilot for his convoy and spending 40 minutes in the freezing water.

The next day she sank Atheltemplar south-west of Bear Island.

Third patrol and loss
The submarine's third and last sortie began from Narvik on 31 October 1942. On 5 November she was sunk by a US PBY Catalina from VP-84 north of Iceland. Her previous track was from the east, towards the Denmark Strait, (which separates Greenland from Iceland).

Forty-five men died in U-408; there were no survivors.

Wolfpacks
U-408 took part in two wolfpacks, namely:
 Eisteufel (21 June – 10 July 1942) 
 Trägertod (12 – 22 September 1942)

Summary of raiding history

References

Bibliography

External links

German Type VIIC submarines
U-boats commissioned in 1941
U-boats sunk in 1942
U-boats sunk by US aircraft
U-boats sunk by depth charges
1941 ships
Ships built in Danzig
Ships lost with all hands
World War II submarines of Germany
World War II shipwrecks in the Arctic Ocean
Maritime incidents in November 1942